The following is a list of German indoor arenas. Indoor stadiums with a capacity of at least 2,000 are included.

Notes
Note 1: Only selected games are played in the arena.

References

See also 
List of football stadiums in Germany
List of indoor arenas in Europe
List of indoor arenas by capacity

 
Germany
Indoor arenas
Indoor arenas